Neya Chiefdom is a chiefdom in Koinadugu District of Sierra Leone. Its capital is Krubola.

References 

Chiefdoms of Sierra Leone
Northern Province, Sierra Leone